Wakan may refer to:
Wakan, meaning "powerful" or "sacred" in the Lakota language
Wakan, the original Lakota name for the Rum River of Minnesota
Wakan Tanka (variant name), the "Great Spirit," "sacred" or the "divine" as understood by the Lakota people
A Japanese word (和館, lit. "Japan hall/building") used to describe historical Japanese settlements and missions in foreign countries. See waegwan, the Korean reading of the word
Waegwan in Chilgok County, North Gyeongsang province, South Korea, sharing the same name.
 Wakan rōeishū 和漢朗詠集: A Collection of Chinese and Japanese Poems